This is a list of cricketers who played for either Cambridge Town Club (CTC) or the original Cambridgeshire County Cricket Club in first-class cricket matches between 1817 and 1871. Players who played for teams with the alternate titles of Cambridge Union Club (1826–1833), Cambridge Townsmen (one match only in 1848) and the Cambridge Town and County Club (1844–1856) are included, all being variations of CTC.

The Town Club was formed before 1817. The original county club was formally established in March 1844 but folded in 1868, although a handful of Cambridgeshire matches were played until 1871.  The modern county club, which plays in the Minor Counties Championship, was founded in June 1891. Cambridge University Cricket Club co-existed in its early years but has always been a separate entity.

The details are the player's usual name followed by the years in which he played first-class matches for one of the sides and then his name is given as it would appear on a modern match scorecard. Some players also played for the University and many players represented other teams outside Cambridgeshire. Six Cambridgeshire players were part of the combined Cambridgeshire and Yorkshire XI which played a combined Kent and Nottinghamshire XI in 1864.

A

B

C

D

E

F

G
 Robert Glasscock (1832–1834) : R. Glasscock
 Henry Gray (1859–1861) : H. Gray
 Joseph Grout (1838) : J. Grout

H

J

K
 John King (1861–1864) : J. King
 Robert Turner King (1846–1847) : R. T. King
 John Kirwan (1840) : J. H. Kirwan

L
 James Lawrence (1820) : J. Lawrence
 John Lee (1847) : J. M. Lee
 Richard Lenton (1828–1844) : R. D. Lenton
 William Lillywhite (1841) : F. W. Lillywhite
 Frederick Long (1841) : F. E. Long

M

N

O
 Frederick Odams (1867) : F. W. Odams
 Owen (1819–1821) : Owen

P

R

S

T

W

Notes

References

Cambridgeshire
Cambridgeshire